Juozapas Sapiega (1737-1792) was a Lithuanian nobleman, Great Krajczy of Lithuania, Regimentarz of the Bar Confederation of Lithuania, Marshal of the powiat Wołkowysk during the Bar Confederation.

Children
 Aleksandras Antonijus Sapiega (1773-1812), miecznik of the Duchy of Warsaw, husband of Anna Jadwiga z Zamoyskich Sapieżyna

Bibliography

1737 births
1792 deaths
Jozef
Lithuanian politicians
Members of the Sejm of the Polish–Lithuanian Commonwealth